Moslem Firoozabadi is an Iranian football player playing for Almineuem of the IPL.

He is believed to be one of the best players of Kerman province that some injuries could not allow him to get the most out of his talent.

Career
Firoozabadi has played for Gol Gohar since 2007.

References

External sources
 Profile at Persianleague

Living people
Iranian footballers
Gol Gohar players
Mes Sarcheshme players
Association football forwards
Year of birth missing (living people)